Bulloch is a surname, and may refer to

 Angela Bulloch (born 1966), British artist
 Archibald Bulloch (–1777), American lawyer and politician
 Gordon Bulloch (born 1975), Scottish rugby player
 Irvine Bulloch (1842–1898), American Confederate Navy officer
 James Dunwoody Bulloch (1823–1901), American overseas agent for the Confederate States
 James Stephens Bulloch (1793–1849), Scottish-American settler of Georgia and grandfather of Theodore Roosevelt
 Jeremy Bulloch (1945–2020), British actor
 Martha Bulloch (1835–1884), mother of Theodore Roosevelt
 William Bellinger Bulloch (1777–1852), American politician
 Willie Bulloch (1895–1962), Scottish footballer
William J Bulloch (1832–1905), Canadian co founder Parmenter and Bulloch

See also
 Bulloch County, Georgia
 Bulloch Hall
 Bullock (disambiguation)